Junjanbail is a village in Dharwad district of Karnataka, India.

Demographics 
As of the 2011 Census of India there were 232 households in Junjanbail and a total population of 1,287 consisting of 687 males and 600 females. There were 200 children ages 0-6.

References

Villages in Dharwad district